Blenden Hall (sometimes Blendon Hall) was a full-rigged ship, launched in 1811 at Bursledon, Hampshire, England. A French frigate captured her in 1813, but then abandoned her. After her recovery she returned to trade. She was wrecked in 1821 on Inaccessible Island in a notable incident.

Career
Blenden Hall first appears in Lloyd's Register in 1811 showing owner as Swan & Co and J. Farrier, master, with ownership changing by 1812 to Anderson & Co. In 1813 her master changed from Farrier to J. Barr, and her owner from Andersen to Sheddens.

Due to a heavy storm, the five merchantmen lost contact with the convoy and its escort. On 5 December the French frigate Clorinde captured all five merchant vessels, in the Atlantic Ocean.

The French took off the crews of four vessels and scuttled three. They kept Lusitania as a cartel and put all their captives aboard her. In their haste, they failed to sink Blenden Hall. They then permitted Lusitania to sail to a British port.

On 12 December the Falmouth packet Eliza, homebound to England from Malta, found Blenden Hall drifting. Eliza put a 10-man prize crew aboard and both set off for Falmouth. Bad weather intervened and the two separated. On 16 December  came on the scene and under a dubious pretext put her own prize crew aboard Blenden Hall as well. On 18 December  brought Blenden Hall into Plymouth. There, Blenden Hall was reunited with her crew, which had arrived that same day. Challenger sued for salvage on Blenden Hall, but the Admiralty Court pointed out that Elizas crew had not required Challengers help and dismissed the case.

Barr resumed his voyage. Blenden Hall arrived at Jamaica on 8 June 1814 from London and Bermuda.

In 1814 Captain Anthony Greig purchased Blenden Hall. At that time she received a license from the British East India Company to sail east of the Cape of Good Hope.

Loss

On the way Blendan Hall encountered the merchant ship , which was on her way to Madras. The weather being dead calm, Greig spent a day on Daphne and had a "Most excellent dinner".

Blendan Hall was reported to have been at Cape Verde on 8 June, but by 1 December she had not arrived at Bombay and there had been no further word of her. The reason for the lack of news was that on 22 July the weather was foggy and Blenden Hall had drifted on to the rocks at Inaccessible Island in the South Atlantic. Two seamen drowned trying to swim to shore. However all the passengers and the rest of the crew reached shore safely. Once there, they were marooned for four months. They subsisted on celery, penguins, albatroses, birds' eggs, and seal meat. On 19 October six men sailed for Tristan da Cunha on a boat or raft that the survivors had constructed; this party was never heard from again. The survivors constructed a second boat that with three men aboard reached Tristan da Cunha on 8 November. Two boats set out from the island and rescued the remainder of the survivors.

After two more months the British snow Nerina called at Tristan da Cunha. On 8 January 1822 she left the island with the survivors (a sailor and a woman servant stayed behind); she landed them at Cape Town on 20 January.

Post script
Blenden Halls second mate was Thomas Lyell Smyers, and her surgeon was his brother George.

Notes

Citations

References
 
 
 

1811 ships
Captured ships
Age of Sail merchant ships
Merchant ships of the United Kingdom
Maritime incidents in 1813
Maritime incidents in July 1821
Full-rigged ships
Ships built in Hampshire
Shipwrecks in the Atlantic Ocean
History of Tristan da Cunha